Bouza is a surname. Notable people with the surname include:

Herminia Bouza (born 1965), Cuban javelin thrower 
José Luis Bouza, Spanish sprint canoer
Matt Bouza (born 1958), American football player
Pablo Bouza (born 1973), Argentine rugby union player 
Tony Bouza (born 1928), Spanish-American police officer
Willan Bouza (born 1961), Uruguayan judoka
Yoel Bouza (born 1987), American technology entrepreneur and investor

See also
Bouzas